Zarrin-e Chaqa (also Romanized as Zarrīn-e Chaqā; also known as Zarrīn-e Mehrābād) is a village in Dowreh Rural District, Chegeni District, Dowreh County, Lorestan Province, Iran. At the 2006 census, its population was 319, in 70 families.

References 

Towns and villages in Dowreh County